Ryan John Malleck (born July 22, 1993) is an American football tight end who is currently a free agent. He played college football at Virginia Tech.

Born in Teaneck, New Jersey, Malleck grew up on the Jersey Shore in Point Pleasant as a fan of the New York Giants. He played football at Point Pleasant Borough High School.

Professional career

New York Giants
Malleck signed with the New York Giants as an undrafted free agent on May 6, 2016. He was waived/injured by the Giants on August 30, 2016 and placed on injured reserve. He was released with an injury settlement on September 3, 2016.

Pittsburgh Steelers
On February 22, 2017, Malleck signed with the Pittsburgh Steelers. He was waived by the Steelers on May 16, 2017.

Baltimore Ravens
On June 6, 2017, Malleck signed with the Baltimore Ravens. He was waived on September 2, 2017 and was signed to the Ravens' practice squad the next day. He was released on September 12, 2017, but was re-signed on September 27. He was released on October 10, 2017.

Houston Texans
On November 29, 2017, Malleck was signed to the Houston Texans' practice squad. He was promoted to the active roster on December 23, 2017.

On April 30, 2018, Malleck was waived by the Texans.

Second stint with the Steelers
On June 5, 2018, Malleck signed with the Steelers on a one-year deal. He was waived/injured on August 2, 2018 and was placed on injured reserve. He was released on November 20, 2018.

References

External links
Virginia Tech Hokies bio

1993 births
Living people
American football tight ends
Virginia Tech Hokies football players
New York Giants players
Pittsburgh Steelers players
Baltimore Ravens players
Houston Texans players
Players of American football from New Jersey
People from Teaneck, New Jersey
Point Pleasant Borough High School alumni
Sportspeople from Bergen County, New Jersey
People from Point Pleasant, New Jersey
Sportspeople from Ocean County, New Jersey